Emamqoli (also Romanized as Emāmqolī) is a village in Qaleh-ye Mozaffari Rural District, in the Central District of Selseleh County, Lorestan Province, Iran. At the 2006 census, its population was 40, in 9 families.

References 

Towns and villages in Selseleh County